María Eugenia Oyarzún Iglesias (born 1 June 1936) is a Chile a journalist, writer, and former diplomat.

Biography
Oyarzún is married to Fernando Errázuriz Guzmán, with whom she has children.

During the military dictatorship of General Augusto Pinochet, Oyarzún occupied the de facto position of mayor of Santiago from 1 June 1975 to 1 June 1976.

She was ambassador of the Government of Chile to the Organization of American States. She was the first woman to preside over the Political Council of that entity in October and December 1977.

Thanks to her close relationship with Pinochet, she was able to conduct interviews of him for various media, which would later be published in several books during the 1990s.

Oyarzún worked for the Santiago daily La Tercera for 46 years, and was director of the journalism schools of the University of Chile and UNIACC.

Works
 Augusto Pinochet: diálogos con su historia. Conversaciones inéditas (Editorial Sudamericana, 1999)
 Augusto Pinochet: "Una visión del hombre" (Editorial Bauhaus, 1995)

Awards
 1965 – Lenka Franulic Award  from the 
 1996 – Carmen Puelma Award from the Chilean Safety Association

References

1936 births
Living people
20th-century Chilean women writers
20th-century Chilean non-fiction writers
21st-century Chilean women writers
21st-century Chilean non-fiction writers
Permanent Representatives of Chile to the Organization of American States
Chilean journalists
Chilean people of Basque descent
Chilean women journalists
Mayors of Santiago
Academic staff of the University of Chile
Women ambassadors
Chilean women diplomats
Chilean diplomats
Chilean non-fiction writers